The  flows through Aichi Prefecture, Japan, from the north to the west.

River communities
Aichi Prefecture
Kōnan, Inazawa, Aisai, Tsushima, Kanie, Nagoya, Tobishima

References

Rivers of Aichi Prefecture
Rivers of Japan